Cowl Bazaar is a suburb of Chennai located in the Chengalpattu district of Tamil Nadu, India. It is a village panchayat in St.Thomas Mount Block located north of Pozhichalur and west of Chennai International Airport along the banks of Adyar River. It is located about  Marina Beach and  Porur. It is located closer to other major suburban areas like Pammal, Pallavaram, Anakaputhur and Kundrathur. The neighborhood is served by Pallavaram railway station of the Chennai Suburban Railway Network. The Cowl Bazaar Bridge connects Pallavaram, Pammal and Pozhichalur with Kolapakkam, Porur, Moulivakkam and Manapakkam. The Pallavaram - Kolapakkam Road connects Pallavaram with Kolapakkam via Pammal and Pozhichalur runs along Cowl Bazaar.

References 
 

Suburbs of Chennai